Alpha-amylase 1 is an enzyme that in humans is encoded by the AMY1A gene. This gene is found in many organisms.

Amylases are secreted proteins that hydrolyze 1,4-alpha-glucoside bonds in oligosaccharides and polysaccharides, and thus catalyze the first step in digestion of dietary starch and glycogen. The human genome has a cluster of several amylase genes that are expressed at high levels in either salivary gland or pancreas. This gene encodes an amylase isoenzyme produced by the salivary gland. Alternative splicing results in multiple transcript variants encoding the same protein.

See also
 AMY2A

References

External links

Further reading